Knödel (and ) or Klöße are boiled dumplings commonly found in Central European and East European cuisine. Countries in which their variant of Knödel is popular include Austria, Germany, Hungary, Poland, Romania, Bosnia, Croatia, Serbia, Slovenia, Slovakia, Bulgaria and Czechia. They are also found in Scandinavian, Romanian, northeastern Italian cuisine, Ukrainian and Belarusian cuisines. Usually made from flour, bread or potatoes, they are often served as a side dish, but can also be a dessert such as plum dumplings, or even meat balls in soup. Many varieties and variations exist.

Etymology
The word  is German and is cognate with the English word knot and the Latin word  'knot'. Through the Old High German  and the Middle High German  it finally changed to the modern expression. In some regions of the United States, klub is used to refer specifically to potato dumplings. A similar dish is known in Sweden ( or ) and in Norway ( or ), filled with salty meat; and in Canada.

Varieties
 
Knödel are used in various dishes in Austrian, German, Slovak and Czech cuisine. From these regions, Knödel spread throughout Europe.

Leberknödel are large dumplings made of ground liver and a batter made of bread soaked in milk and seasoned with nutmeg or other spices, boiled in beef stock and served as a soup. 
Klöße are also large dumplings, steamed or boiled in hot water, made of dough from grated raw or mashed potatoes, eggs and flour. Similar semolina crack dumplings are made with semolina, egg and butter called Grießklößchen (Austrian Grießnockerl, Hungarian grízgaluska, Silesian "gumiklyjza"). Thüringer Klöße are made from raw or boiled potatoes, or a mixture of both, and are often filled with croutons or ham.
Bread dumplings (Semmelknödel) are made with dried white bread, milk and egg yolks (are sometimes shaped like a loaf of bread, and boiled in a napkin, in which case they are known as napkin dumplings or Serviettenknödel). If bacon is added they are called Speckknödel.
Plum dumplings (Slavic: knedle), popular over Central Europe, are large sweet dumplings made with flour and potato batter, by wrapping the potato dough around whole plums (or apricots), boiled and rolled in hot buttered caramelized bread crumbs. 
Dumplings made with quark cheese, traditionally topped with cinnamon sugar and served with apple sauce or with streusel.
In Brazil, German immigrants traditionally make Klöße with white rice, wheat flour and eggs, mixing them into a sturdy dough, shaping them in dumplings and boiling them.
Königsberger Klopse are, unlike regular dumplings, made from ground meat and are related to Frikadeller.
Frankenburger Bratknödel, are unique to the market town of Frankenburg am Hausruck and filled with a saucy meatball.
Matzah balls could be considered Knödel made from matzah meal. The Yiddish word for Matzah balls,  (kneydl), is cognate to Knödel. Matzah balls originated among Ashkenazi Jewish groups in Eastern or Central Europe.
 Lithuanian Cepelinai.
 Polish Knedle.
 Marillenknödel apricot dumplings in Austrian cuisine
 Germknödel filled with spiced powidl, topped with sugar, poppy seeds and butter

Gallery

See also

References

Further reading

External links

 Klöße/Dumplings

Dumplings
Potato dishes
German cuisine
Luxembourgian cuisine
Austrian cuisine
Czech cuisine
Slovak cuisine
Hungarian cuisine
Plum dishes